The Botanical Museum in Copenhagen originated as a part of the Copenhagen Botanical Garden, which was established in 1600. It was later separated as an independent institution. Since 2004, the Botanical Museum forms part of the Natural History Museum of Denmark under the University of Copenhagen. It does not have exhibitions open to the public.

The collections contain many type specimens and vast collections from around the world.

External links
Overview

University of Copenhagen
Natural history museums in Denmark
University museums in Denmark